Rhiannon Marie Fish (born March 14, 1991) is a Canadian actress. Her first screen acting role was Lisa Jeffries in the television soap opera Neighbours. She starred as Rocky in the Disney Channel show As the Bell Rings and as Laura in Playing for Charlie. From 2010 until 2013, she played April Scott on Home and Away. Fish took part in season 13 of Dancing with the Stars, and she joined the recurring cast of The 100 as Ontari in 2016.

Early and personal life
Fish was born in Calgary, Alberta, Canada. Her family relocated to Melbourne when she was four years old. Her father was transferred to Russia for work when she was 12, but decided to keep the family in Australia. Fish attended the Camberwell Girls Grammar School and the Children's Performing Company of Australia, which she graduated from in 2008. Fish decided to pursue an acting career when she was eleven years old. Her older sister, Corinne, died in July 2014.

Career
Fish first appeared on television at the age of eleven when she starred in Neighbours as Lisa Jeffries. She was later cast as Rocky in the Australian Disney Channel show As the Bell Rings. Fish had a guest role in Satisfaction and starred in the feature film Playing for Charlie in 2008. Fish received the role of April Scott in Home and Away in 2010. For her portrayal of April, Fish was included on the long list for the Most Popular New Talent Logie Award in 2011.

In 2012, Fish appeared in the music video for Mastin's single "Shout It Out". After departing Home and Away in 2013, Fish participated in the 13th series of Dancing with the Stars, reaching second place behind Cosentino. In November 2015, Fish joined the cast of The 100 in the recurring role of Ontari. Fish appears in the 2018 sci-fi action film Occupation, alongside her former Home and Away co-star Dan Ewing. Fish appears in the 2021 Hallmark television film Signed, Sealed, Delivered: The Vows We Have Made, alongside Eric Mabius and Kristin Booth.

In 2022, Fish filmed the lead role in Adrian Powers and Caera Bradshaw's A Royal In Paradise, in which she plays a struggling romance writer who meets and falls in love with a prince (played by Mitchell Bourke) during a tropical getaway. The film was shot in Queensland.  Fish also signed on to star in Jo-Anne Brechin's romantic film When Love Springs, alongside James O'Halloran.

Filmography

References

External links

1991 births
Actresses from Calgary
Canadian child actresses
Canadian film actresses
Canadian soap opera actresses
Canadian emigrants to Australia
Living people